Ernesto Vecchi (4 January 1936 – 28 May 2022) was an Italian Roman Catholic auxiliary bishop.

Vecchi was born in Italy and was ordained to the priesthood for the Roman Catholic Archdiocese of Bologna, Italy, in 1963. He served as titular bishop of Lemellefe and as auxiliary bishop of the Bologna Archdiocese from 1998 until his retirement in 2011. Vecchi also served as the apostolic administrator of the Roman Catholic Diocese of Terni-Narni-Amelia, Italy, in 2013 and 2014.

References

1936 births
2022 deaths
Roman Catholic bishops in Italy
20th-century Roman Catholic titular bishops
21st-century Roman Catholic titular bishops
Bishops in Emilia-Romagna
Bishops of Bologna
People from the Province of Bologna